Burnsius albescens, the white checkered-skipper, formerly known as Pyrgus albescens, is a species of skipper (family Hesperiidae). It is found at low altitudes in the southern United States (southern California, southern Arizona, southern New Mexico, western and southern Texas, Florida) and Mexico. It is a rare stray to southwest Utah and central Texas and is found in a variety of dry, open habitats.

The wingspan is 25–38 mm. Adults are on wing year round in most of its range. 

The larva probably feed on several plants in the  family Malvaceae, including Sphaeralcea, Abutilon and Callirhoe. Adults feed on the nectar of a variety of plants.

References

External links
Butterflies and Moths of North America

Pyrgini
Butterflies described in 1884
Butterflies of North America